B2K is the debut album by B2K. It was released on March 12, 2002. The album debuted number 2 on the Billboard 200 and number 1 on the R&B/Hip-Hop Albums Chart selling 109,000 copies in the first week.

Track listing 
"Gots Ta Be" – 5:21 - Lead Vocals: Omarion, Steve Russell and  Raz-B
"Understanding"  – 3:52 Lead Vocals: Omarion
"Why I Love You" – 4:00 Lead Vocals: Omarion and Steve Russell
"Uh Huh" – 3:43 Lead vocals: Omarion / Rap vocals: Lil’ Fizz
"B2K Is Hot (Skit)" – 0:35 Vocals: B2K
"B2K Is Hot" – 3:39 Lead Vocals: Omarion / Rap Vocals: Lil’ Fizz
"Fantasy" – 3:44 Lead Vocals: Omarion / Rap Vocals: Lil’ Fizz
"I'm Not Finished" – 4:26 Lead Vocals: Omarion 
"Come On" – 4:05 Lead Vocals: Omarion and Raz-B
"Hey Little Lady (Interlude)" – 0:28 Vocals: B2K
"Hey Little Lady" – 3:52 Lead Vocals: Omarion / Rap Vocals: Lil’ Fizz
"Baby Girl" – 4:50 Lead Vocals: Omarion and Raz-B
"Your Girl Chose Me" – 2:53 Lead vocals: Omarion
"Shorty" – 3:22 Lead Vocals: Omarion / Rap Vocals: Lil’ Fizz
"Feel This Way" – 3:53 Lead Vocals: Omarion and J-Boog
"Last Boyfriend" – 3:27 Lead Vocals: Omarion / Rap Vocals: Lil’ Fizz
"Here We Go Again" – 4:07 Lead Vocals: Omarion and Romeo Of IMX

Singles 
 "Uh Huh"
Released: July 17, 2001
 "Gots Ta Be"
Released: February 26, 2002 
 "Why I Love You"
Released: May 7, 2002

Charts

Weekly charts

Year-end charts

Certifications

See also 
List of Billboard number-one R&B albums of 2002

References 

B2K albums
2002 albums
Albums produced by Bryan-Michael Cox
Albums produced by Jermaine Dupri
Epic Records albums